ISO 3166-2:AU is the entry for Australia in ISO 3166-2, part of the ISO 3166 standard published by the International Organization for Standardization (ISO), which defines codes for the names of the principal subdivisions (e.g., provinces or states) of all countries coded in ISO 3166-1.

Currently for Australia, ISO 3166-2 codes are defined for 6 states and 2 territories. Lesser territories that are under the administration of the commonwealth government, such as the Jervis Bay Territory, the Ashmore and Cartier Islands, and the Coral Sea Islands, are not listed.

Each code consists of two parts, separated by a hyphen. The second part is two or three letters, which is the conventional abbreviation of the state or territory (defined in Australian Standard AS ).

Current codes
Subdivision names are listed as in the ISO 3166-2 standard published by the ISO 3166 Maintenance Agency (ISO 3166/MA).

Click on the button in the header to sort each column.

The external territories of Christmas Island, the Cocos (Keeling) Islands and Norfolk Island have their own ISO 3166-1 codes and are not included in Australia's entry in ISO 3166-2. There are no ISO 3166-2 codes for:
 Ashmore and Cartier Islands
 Australian Antarctic Territory (part of Antarctica with country code AQ)
 Coral Sea Islands
 Jervis Bay Territory

Changes
The following changes to the entry have been announced in newsletters by the ISO 3166/MA since the first publication of ISO  in 1998. ISO stopped issuing newsletters in 2013.

The following changes to the entry are listed on ISO's online catalogue, the Online Browsing Platform:

External territories
Four of the external territories of Australia are officially assigned their own country codes in ISO 3166-1, with the following alpha-2 codes:
  Cocos (Keeling) Islands
  Christmas Island
  Heard Island and McDonald Islands
  Norfolk Island

Under the definitions in ISO 3166-1, the Ashmore and Cartier Islands and the Coral Sea Islands are covered by Australia, and the Australian Antarctic Territory is covered by Antarctica, with alpha-2 code .

See also
 Subdivisions of Australia
 FIPS region codes of Australia

External links
 ISO Online Browsing Platform: AU
 States of Australia, Statoids.com
 ISO page for Australia

2:AU
ISO 3166-2
Australia geography-related lists